V Riigikogu was the fifth legislature of the Estonian Parliament (Riigikogu). The legislature was elected after 1932 elections (held on 21–23 May 1932). It sat between 15 June 1932 and 2 October 1934, when its activities were suspended. The session formally ended on 31 December 1937.

Parties and seats

Officers 
Source:

Chairman 
 20.06.1932–19.07.1932: Karl Eenpalu
 19.07.1932–18.05.1933: Jaan Tõnisson
 18.05.1933–29.08.1934: Karl Eenpalu
 28.09.1934–31.12.1937: Rudolf Penno

First Assistant Chairman 
 20.06.1932–19.07.1932: Tõnis Kalbus
 19.07.1932–01.12.1933: Jaan Soots
 01.12.1933–28.09.1934: Rudolf Penno

Second Assistant Chairman 
 20.06.1932–04.10.1933: Mihkel Martna
 04.10.1933–02.10.1934: Karl Ast
 02.10.1934–31.12.1937: Leopold Johannes Johanson

Secretary 
 20.06.1932–31.12.1937: Jaagup Loosalu

First Assistant Secretary 
 20.06.1932–31.12.1937: August Tõllasepp

Second Assistant Secretary 
 20.06.1932–31.12.1937: Oskar Gustavson

Members of the Riigikogu

References

Riigikogu